The Northern Premier Cricket League is a cricket league in the North West of England and was designated as an ECB Premier League in 2000. Prior to that date it was known as the Northern Cricket League.

Because the Northern Premier Cricket League had no formal feeder league and no automatic relegation and promotion, the ECB suggested on several occasions that its ECB Premier League status might be withdrawn.  As from 2017, the Palace Shield became the Northern Premier League's feeder league and promotion and relegation between the two leagues took place for the first time at the end of the 2017 season.

History
The Northern Cricket League was founded on 10 November 1951, in controversial circumstances.

Several of the clubs in the west of the area covered by the Ribblesdale League had been unhappy for some time about the format of that League. The League had a membership of 18 clubs which meant that only 5 opponents in the League were played against twice per season whilst the remainder were played against once. This group of clubs met secretly on 7 October 1951 and produced a handwritten document which stated:

''The following Ribblesdale League clubs:- Blackpool, Chorley, Darwen, Fleetwood, Lancaster, Leyland, Morecambe, St Annes being duly authorised by their respective Committees are resolved from this meeting to request the Ribblesdale League to form a West Section, comprising the above named clubs together with Leyland Motors, Furness and Kendal. Failing agreement on the part of the Ribblesdale League the above eight clubs pledge themselves to resign forthwith from the Ribblesdale League and to create a new league, which would include an invitation to Leyland Motors, Furness, Kendal and Preston.

At the AGM of the Ribblesdale League, held in Whalley on 10 November 1951, the motion was proposed to form West and East sections with the West section comprising Blackpool, Chorley, Darwen, Fleetwood, Lancaster, Leyland, Morecambe, and St Annes, plus two new clubs Furness and Kendal (both from the North Lancashire Cricket League) along with Leyland Motors if they wished to play in the West section. After discussion, the vote was 9–9 and was defeated on the casting vote of the President who had earlier expressed distaste at the way the western clubs had acted.

The eight clubs duly resigned from the Ribblesdale League, as did Leyland Motors, and representatives of these clubs along with those of Furness and Kendal then met at the Swan Hotel in Whalley where the Northern Cricket League was formed. Preston Cricket Club were invited to join the new league as the twelfth team. The invitation was accepted but they remained in the Liverpool and District Cricket Competition for one further year before participating in the Northern Cricket League's second season in 1953.

Furness left the league after the 1958 season to be replaced by Netherfield, but there were to be no further changes to the membership until Barrow joined the league in 2004.  More recent changes in the membership can be seen below.  Leyland merged with lower level club BTR in 2000 and adopted the name Leyland and Farington, while Leyland Motors were known as Leyland DAF between 1991 and 2000. Founder members Darwen left the league after the 2016 season. In 2017 promotion and relegation was agreed between the Northern League and Palace Shield and at the end of the season Garstang and Fulwood & Broughton replaced Lancaster and Kendal. For the 2023 season, Fleetwood re-joined the Northern League as Palace Shield champions, alongside Palace Shield runners-up and Northern League newcomers Eccleston with Lancaster and Vernon Carus going in the opposition direction and both returning to the Palace Shield.

Winners
 

 

 

 

 

source.

Division One performance by season from 2000

References

External links
Northern Premier Cricket League play-cricket website
Northern Cricket League website

English domestic cricket competitions
Cricket in Lancashire
ECB Premier Leagues